Mohammad Mansouri  (born September 23, 1979) is an Iranian footballer who plays for Mes Sarcheshmeh in the Iran Pro League.

Club career
Mansouri has been with Zob Ahan since 2004.

Club career statistics

 Assist Goals

References

1979 births
Living people
Iranian footballers
Azadegan League players
Persian Gulf Pro League players
Zob Ahan Esfahan F.C. players
Bargh Shiraz players
Saipa F.C. players
Sanat Mes Kerman F.C. players
Association football midfielders